The 1919 Preakness Stakes was the 44th running of the $50,000 added Preakness Stakes, a horse race for three-year-old Thoroughbreds. The event took place on May 14, 1919 and was run four days after the Kentucky Derby. Ridden by Johnny Loftus, the Derby winner Sir Barton easily won the mile and an eighth race by four lengths over runner-up Eternal. The race was run on a track rated fast in a final time of 1:53 flat.

Sir Barton's Preakness would become what is known as the second leg of the U.S. Triple Crown series.

Payout 
The 44th Preakness Stakes Payout Schedule

The full chart 
Daily Racing Form Chart

 Winning Breeder: John E. Madden & Vivian A. Gooch; (KY)
 Times: 1/4 mile 0:23 2/5; 1/2 mile – 0:47 1/5; 3/4 mile – 1:13  0/0; mile – 1:39 1/5; 1 3/16 (final) – 1:59 0/0.
 Track condition: fast
 †  - denotes entry

References

External links 
 

1919
Pimlico Race Course
1919 in horse racing
1919 in American sports
1919 in sports in Maryland
Horse races in Maryland